The chestnut-shouldered antwren (Euchrepomis humeralis) is an insectivorous bird in the antbird family Thamnophilidae. It is found in far northwestern Bolivia, Peru, Ecuador and western Brazil. Its natural habitat is subtropical or tropical moist lowland forests.

The chestnut-shouldered antwren was described by the English ornithologists Philip Sclater and Osbert Salvin in 1880 and given the binomial name Terenura humeralis. The current genus Euchrepomis was introduced in 2012.

References

chestnut-shouldered antwren
Birds of the Amazon Basin
Birds of the Ecuadorian Amazon
Birds of the Peruvian Amazon
chestnut-shouldered antwren
chestnut-shouldered antwren
chestnut-shouldered antwren
Taxonomy articles created by Polbot